Brazil is an unincorporated community in Gibson County, in the U.S. state of Tennessee. An old variant name was Poplar Grove.

The post office called Brazil was discontinued in 1902.

References

Unincorporated communities in Gibson County, Tennessee
Unincorporated communities in Tennessee